Arc Developments was a British game developer best known for developing Johnny Bazookatone. The company was founded by a group of former Elite employees. Since then, the company has ported many games to various systems and computers, but they also developed their own titles, such as Johnny Bazookatone. They rarely put credits in their games for an unknown reason.

Games developed by Arc Developments

Defunct video game companies of the United Kingdom
Video game companies established in 1988
Video game companies disestablished in 1998
1988 establishments in the United Kingdom
1998 disestablishments in the United Kingdom